030 (also known as [030] Magazin Berlin), is a free ad-supported German magazine from Berlin. Its name refers to the dialing code of the city. It was founded on 6 October 1994 and provides information about movies, concerts, parties, sports, and new media. It is distributed in bars, pubs and restaurants and is published every two weeks. The print run is 52,000 pieces. The [030] has belonged to Zitty Verlag GmbH from 2008 - 2015.

Since January 2016, the [030] Magazin Homepage had an online relaunch. The publisher and editors have been located in Berlin-Prenzlauer Berg.

References

External links
 030 official website

1994 establishments in Germany
Biweekly magazines published in Germany
City guides
Free magazines
German-language magazines
Local interest magazines
Magazines established in 1994
Magazines published in Berlin